Kanga Gauthier Akalé (born 7 March 1981) is an Ivorian former professional footballer who played as a midfielder.

Club career
Whilst at Auxerre he helped them win the Coupe de France in both 2003 and 2005, playing in both finals. In June 2007, Akalé signed a four-year contract with RC Lens for an undisclosed transfer fee, and he was loaned to Marseille in January 2008, then Recreativo de Huelva.  Originally a striker, he started playing as a central midfielder or left winger. He is described as a pacey player with top technical abilities.

In 2011, Akalé joined Qatari club Lekhwiya SC to cover for injured striker, and countryman Bakari Koné. He made his debut in the 2011 Qatari Stars Cup on 11 November, and scored a hat-trick against Al Rayyan in a 3–1 win.

On 31 January 2012, Akalé signed a six-month contract with Greek club Panetolikos F.C. About three months after becoming a free agent, on 24 October 2012, Akalé joined French Ligue 2 side Arles-Avignon on a two-year contract.

International career
He has 35 caps for the national team, and was called up to the 2006 World Cup.

Career statistics

Club

International
Source:

International goals
Source:

Honors
Ivory Coast
Africa Cup of Nations runner-up:2006

References

External links
 

Living people
1981 births
Footballers from Abidjan
Association football midfielders
Ivorian footballers
Ivory Coast international footballers
Swiss Super League players
Ligue 1 players
Ligue 2 players
La Liga players
Qatar Stars League players
Stella Club d'Adjamé players
FC Sion players
FC Zürich players
AJ Auxerre players
RC Lens players
Olympique de Marseille players
Recreativo de Huelva players
Lekhwiya SC players
Panetolikos F.C. players
AC Arlésien players
2006 FIFA World Cup players
Ivorian expatriate footballers
Ivorian expatriate sportspeople in France
Ivorian expatriate sportspeople in Spain
Ivorian expatriate sportspeople in Switzerland
Expatriate footballers in France
Expatriate footballers in Spain
Expatriate footballers in Switzerland